Yamunanagar-Jagadhri railway station is a station on the Moradabad–Ambala line. It is located in the Indian state of Haryana.

History

The Scinde, Punjab & Delhi Railway completed the -long Amritsar–Ambala–Jagadhri–– line in 1870 connecting Multan (now in Pakistan) with Delhi.

Electrification

Ambala–Jagadhri– sector in 1996–98.

Important trains

There are some important trains at Jagadhri railway station

 18237/38 Chhattisgarh Express
 22687/88 Madurai–Dehradun Express
 12207/08 Kathgodam–Jammu Tawi Garib Rath Express
 12903/04 Golden Temple Mail
 12231/32 Lucknow–Chandigarh Express
 13005/06 Amritsar Mail
 14609/10 Hemkunt Express
 12053/54 Haridwar–Amritsar Jan Shatabdi Express
 14523/24 Harihar Express

Carriage & Wagon Workshop, Jagadhri

Carriage & Wagon Workshop, Jagadhari is in Yamunanagar district of Haryana. It is among the eight workshops operated by Northern Railways.

Preceding and next station
Preceding station -------------------------Next station

Kalanour railway station -------------------------------- Jagadhri Workshop railway station

References

Jagadhri
Ambala railway division
Yamunanagar